Turanköy is a village in the Kestel district of Bursa Province in Turkey. The village is populated largely by Bosniaks.

References

Villages in Kestel District